FC Ajka is a Hungarian football club located in Ajka, Hungary. It currently plays in Hungarian National Championship II. The team's colors are white and green.

History
In the 8th round of the 2018–19 Magyar Kupa season Ajka eliminated 2018–19 Nemzeti Bajnokság I club MTK Budapest. However, in the round of 16th Ajka were eliminated by Debreceni VSC on 3–4 aggregate.

Players

Current squad

Other players under contract

References

External links 
 Official website 
 Soccerway

 
Football clubs in Hungary
Association football clubs established in 1923
1923 establishments in Hungary
Sport in Veszprém County